Framo was a minivan, motor tricycle and car manufacturer in Saxony, Germany. It was established by Danish engineer Jørgen Skafte Rasmussen, the founder of DKW, in 1923. Framo became the core of the Barkas minivan manufacturer in 1957.

Formation

Framo was founded by the Danish engineer Jørgen Skafte Rasmussen and two colleagues (Paul Figura, and Richard Blau) as a components supplier in 1923. At this time, the company was called Metall-Werke Frankenberg GmbH and located in Frankenberg, Saxony. Rasmussen had earlier founded DKW, and the Framo factory was created to produce components for DKW motorcycles. Rasmussen played an important role in the establishment of the Auto Union group, and DKW is represented by one ring of the four rings of the Audi brand today.

The production of a motorized freight trike (TV 300) started in Frankenberg in 1927. The idea was to combine a motorcycle with a cargo area. The tricycles were equipped with a one-cylinder-two-stroke engine made by DKW. Framo's lightweight and affordable motorized freight trikes were popular with craftsmen and tradesmen. Based on this success, the models ZW 200, LT 200, LTH 200 and LTH 300 were developed.

Relocation to Hainichen

In 1934, the company moved to Hainichen and was subsequently rebranded as FRAMO-Werke GmbH, Hainichen. Framo is a made-up word based on FRAnkenberg and MOtorenwerk (engine plant). At this point, the company was already employing 700 workers. 1934 also saw the development of compact cars. First, the tricycle Stromer FP 200 was released. Its successors Piccolo VH 200 and Piccolo VH 300 had four wheels. Overall, the cars were not a huge success.
Following up on the earlier success of the motorized freight trikes, a new line of minivans with four wheels was introduced in 1938. The first model was called V 500.

World War II
The production of military products and weapons began in 1943. From September 1944 until April 1945, 500 female prisoners of Hainichen concentration camp, a subcamp of Flossenbürg concentration camp, were forced to work for the Framo enterprise.

East Germany
In 1945, on the orders of the occupying Soviet military administration, the factories were dismantled as part of war reparations and shipped to the Soviet Union.

The factory restarted the assembly of the pre-war-model (V 501/2) in 1949. The newly developed postwar models V 901 and V 902 entered the market in 1951. The development of varying superstructures began in 1953.

Framo museum
A museum dedicated to the brands Framo and Barkas was opened in Frankenberg, Saxony in 1993. As of 2007, eighteen cars, motorized tricycles and minivans are on display.

Gallery

See also
 List of German cars

References

External links
 Framo timeline (in German)
 Framo museum (German Wikipedia)

Companies based in Saxony
Defunct motor vehicle manufacturers of Germany